Un Amigo Tendras (You Will Have a Friend) is the seventeenth studio album by American Tejano music singer Jay Perez. It is the first album by Perez since New Horizons (2012). Un Amigo Tendras peaked at number 15 on the US Billboard Top Latin Albums chart. The album was nominated for Tejano Album of the Year at the 2016 Latin Grammy Awards. Un Amigo Tendras won Tejano Album of the Year at the 2017 Tejano Music Awards, while the title track won Song of the Year.

Track listing 
Credits adapted from the liner notes of Un Amigo Tendras.

Charts

See also 

 2016 in Latin music
 Latin American music in the United States

References

Works cited 

2016 albums
Spanish-language albums
Jay Perez albums
Freddie Records albums